Kyoto is a Japanese city, and the capital of Kyoto Prefecture.

Kyoto may also refer to:
Kyoto Prefecture, a jurisdiction in Japan
Kyoto Protocol, an international Framework Convention on Climate Change
Kyoto University, a Japanese national university in the city of Kyoto 
Kyoto Sanga FC, a football (soccer) club in Kyoto
Kyoto Electronics, a Mexican electronics company
Kyoto, a danzan-ryū technique of jujutsu
"Kyoto" (Yung Lean song), a 2013 song by Swedish rapper Yung Lean
"Kyoto" (Skrillex song), a 2011 song by the electronic music producer Skrillex
"Kyoto" (Phoebe Bridgers song), a 2020 song by American singer Phoebe Bridgers
Kyoto (Art Blakey album), a 1964 album by Art Blakey's Jazz Messengers
Kyoto (Tyga album), 2018
Kyoto shogi, a variant of the game of shogi

See also
Kyoto carryover credits - an international carbon emissions accounting measure